Brady North (born April 24, 1991) is an American professional baseball hitting coach for the Tampa Bay Rays of Major League Baseball.

North attended Cumberland University, where he played college baseball for the Cumberland Phoenix. With Cumberland, North won the NAIA World Series in 2014. The Rays promoted North to their major league coaching staff after the 2021 season.

References

External links

1991 births
Living people
Tampa Bay Rays coaches
Major League Baseball hitting coaches
Cumberland Phoenix baseball players
Jacksonville Dolphins baseball players
Washington Wild Things players
Lake Erie Crushers players